Mordecai I. Parcell (1854 – May 13, 1916) was an American politician in the state of Washington. He served in the Washington House of Representatives from 1895 to 1897.

References

Republican Party members of the Washington House of Representatives
1916 deaths
1854 births
People from Minersville, Pennsylvania
19th-century American politicians